The Hatzenbeck is a left tributary of the Wupper River in the municipal division of Elberfeld-West of the North Rhine-Westphalian city of Wuppertal.

Location and topography
It flows northwest to Ravensberger Road and goes downhill to the University of Wuppertal to the northeast. In earlier times the lower reaches had the name Steinbeck.

Rivers of North Rhine-Westphalia
Rivers of Germany